John J. Tredrea (1884 to 1975) was an Australian rules footballer who played for the  in the South Australian Football League. He was the first South Australian player to reach 200 league games.

References

1884 births
1975 deaths
South Adelaide Football Club players
South Adelaide Football Club coaches
South Australian Football Hall of Fame inductees
Australian rules footballers from South Australia